Shayna Richardson (born 1984) is a student skydiver from Joplin, Missouri who made headlines in 2005 after she survived a skydiving accident and fell face first in a parking lot, and doctors later discovered she was a couple weeks pregnant at the time.

Accident
The accident occurred on October 9, 2005 during Richardson's 1st solo AFF skydive in Siloam Springs, Arkansas.  While it is widely reported in the mainstream media that the accident was the result of equipment malfunction, many in the skydiving community insist that the problem was actually with Richardson's inexperience and the quality of instruction she received from her Instructor, and boyfriend, Rick West.  Shayna and Rick were jumping as guests in Siloam after failing to tell the Siloam dropzone operator that Shayna had been banned from jumping at her home dropzone due to the conflict of interest arising from her relationship with her Instructor.

Recovery 
Rescuers took her to a hospital in Fayetteville, Arkansas, where Richardson underwent surgery having broken her pelvis in two places, her leg and lost six teeth. Richardson now has 15 steel plates and states, "I went into the first surgery where they cut me from ear to ear and they cut my face down and they took out all the fractured egg-shelled bones and put in steel plates."  Remarkably, while treating Richardson for her injuries doctors discovered that she was pregnant; a fact of which Richardson claimed to be unaware.  This is disputed by several jumpers from Siloam who claimed to have congratulated Shayna after she revealed her pregnancy earlier that day.

Shayna's child, Richard Tanner West, was born on June 13, 2006.  He weighed 7 pounds, 13 ounces at birth and appears to not have been affected in any way by the accident. Doctors were concerned that X-rays and medications taken by Shayna may have caused problems with the baby's development. On the programme broadcast by E! 15 Incredible Survival Stories Shayna's doctors say that his development is completely normal and he is a "happy, healthy little boy". Shayna also revealed that she went skydiving one final time after her son was born to prove she could do it. She has never been skydiving since because she states she gets "More of a rush from my little boy and being a Mom is so much more important." As Shayna had no medical insurance the doctors who performed the reconstructive surgery donated their time and services to help her.

References 

1984 births
People from Joplin, Missouri
Living people